SS Patrick S. Mahony was a Liberty ship built in the United States during World War II.

Construction
Patrick S. Mahony was laid down on 30 December 1944, under a Maritime Commission (MARCOM) contract, MC hull 2400, by J.A. Jones Construction, Brunswick, Georgia; she was sponsored by Mrs. L.A. Graves, and launched on 10 February 1945.

History
She was allocated to the Black Diamond Steamship Co., on 22 February 1945. On 13 September 1945, she was laid up in the National Defense Reserve Fleet, in the James River Group. On 10 December 1947, she was laid up in the National Defense Reserve Fleet, in Wilmington, North Carolina. On 19 January 1960, she was sold for $70,318, along with nine other Liberty ships, to Bethlehem Steel, to be scrapped. She was removed from the fleet on 20 February 1960.

References

Bibliography

 
 
 
 
 

 

Liberty ships
Ships built in Brunswick, Georgia
1945 ships
James River Reserve Fleet
Wilmington Reserve Fleet